Suzanne Monnier Voilquin (1801 – December 1876 or January 1877) was a French feminist, journalist, midwife, traveler and author, best known as editor of Tribune des femmes (French Wikipedia Article), the first working-class feminist periodical, and her memoirs, Souvenirs d’une fille du peuple: ou, La saint-simonienne en Égypt.

Biography

Early life 

Suzanne Voilquin (née Monnier) was born in Paris in 1801 to a working-class family.  She received some convent education, and spent most of her youth nursing her dying mother, raising her little sister and working as an embroiderer.

Marriage and Saint-Simonism 

Suzanne met and married Eugène Voilquin, an architect in 1825.  The couple became supporters of Saint-Simonism, a Utopian Socialist movement that adhered to the philosophy of Comte de Saint-Simon.  Its leaders included Barthélemy Prosper Enfantin and Saint-Amand Bazard.  Suzanne Voilquin was particularly attracted to the Movement's call to women and workers, “the poorest and most numerous class.”  The Saint-Simonian's popularity and their belief in the liberation of women brought the group into trouble with the French authorities.  After a spectacular trial, Enfantin, Charles Duveyrier and Michel Chevalier were jailed in 1832 and the movement dispersed.  Suzanne, in the meantime, granted Eugène an unofficial “Saint-Simonian” divorce, since divorce was illegal in France.  She gave him her blessing and he left for Louisiana.

Tribune des femmes 

From 1832-1834, Suzanne wrote for and edited The Tribune des femmes, the first known working-class, feminist journal (Its editors rejected the use of last names, as subordinating the women to either their fathers or their husbands).  Suzanne and the other writers, including Marie-Reine Guindorf and Désirée Gay (Jeanne Desirée Véret Gay) stressed the need for women's rights to divorce, education and work.  Suzanne, in particular, emphasized the need for the protection of mothers.  In 1834 Suzanne also published Ma loi d’Avenir by fellow Saint-Simonian Claire Démar after she and her lover, Perret Desessarts, killed themselves.

With Enfantin's release from jail in 1834, Suzanne accepted the Saint-Simonian call to spread the word of the movement throughout the world.  She announced in April, 1834 that she would join other Saint-Simonian women such as Clorinde Roge and travel to Egypt 
to work with the French medical doctors, scientists and engineers, including Ferdinand de Lesseps.  Suzanne pledged herself to a “Life of Active Propaganda,” whereby she would support herself in an effort to show other women that they too could be independent.

Travels and a life of “Active Propaganda” 

Work was scarce in Egypt where many people were quarantined due to the plague.  Suzanne began assisting a French doctor who taught her medicine in exchange for her tutoring his Egyptian children.  She studied Arabic and learned medicine in his clinic and the harems, often wearing Arab male clothing.  Suzanne got the plague, and, although she survived, many of her friends, including the doctor and his family succumbed.  After the plans for a woman's hospital fell through, Suzanne returned to France.

In France, Suzanne became certified as a midwife, studied homeopathy, and continued to work on behalf of women, with an unsuccessful attempt to form a Maternal Association to Aid Young Mothers in 1838. Work was again scarce, and, needing to support herself, her ailing father and her brother who was a political prisoner, Suzanne left for Russia in 1839.  Life was difficult for her in St. Petersburg, where she found little employment, and the winter's cold affected her health.  She returned to France in 1846.

Women's rights again surfaced with the French Revolution of 1848.  Suzanne joined other feminists and Saint-Simonian women including Eugénie Niboyet, Pauline Roland, Jeanne Deroin, Desirée Gay and Elisa Lemonnier to organize on behalf of women's employment and education issues and to write for La Voix des Femmes. Suzanne organized wet nurses and founded a Society of United Midwives.  With the failure of the Republic, lack of funding, and hostile government action, Suzanne once again left France—this time to Louisiana in 1848.
There is little historical record of Suzanne Voilquin's activities in New Orleans.  She joined her sister there, who died in 1849.  Suzanne returned to France in 1860.  She published her memoirs Souvenirs d’une fille du people: ou la Saint-simonienne en Égypt in 1866.

Suzanne Voilquin died in Paris in December 1876 or January 1877.

Writings 

 Mémoires d’une saints-simonienne en Russie (1839-1846).  Edited by Maïté Albistur and Daniel Armogathe.  Paris: Éditions des femmes, 1977.
 Souvenirs d’une fille du peuple ou Saint-simonienne en Égypte.  Paris:  Chez E. Sauzet, 1866.
 Souvenirs d’une fille du peuple ou Saint-simonienne en Égypte. Introduction by Lydia Elhadad.  Paris: François Maspero, 1978.
 Tribune des femmes (Paris), 1832-1834, contributor and editor.

Bibliography 
 Manuel, Frank, The Prophets of Paris.  Cambridge: Harvard University Press, 1962.
 Moses, Claire Goldberg, French Feminism in the 19th Century.  New York: State University of New York, 1984.
 Moses, Claire Goldberg and Rabine, Leslie Wahl, Feminism, Socialism and French Romanticism.  Indiana University Press, 1993.
 Ragan, John David, “French Women Travellers in Egypt: A Discourse Marginal to Orientalism?” in Starkey, Paul and Starkey, Janet, Travellers in Egypt.  London: Tauris Parke, 2001.

References 

French feminists
French non-fiction writers
1801 births
1870s deaths
Saint-Simonists
Working-class feminism
19th-century French women writers
19th-century French women politicians
French socialists
Socialist feminists